Hydershakote is a village and municipality in Hyderabad district, TS, India. It falls under Gandipet mandal.

References

Villages in Ranga Reddy district